O'Donnell Middle School may refer to:
 O'Donnell Middle School, Houston, Texas - Alief Independent School District
 Dr. Robert G. O'Donnell Middle School, Stoughton, Massachusetts - Stoughton Public Schools